Newtown Historic District is a national historic district located at Newtown, King and Queen County, Virginia. About 45 miles northeast of Richmond on the Middle Peninsula, Newtown took the name of the plantation of Captain John Richards, who had a store and ordinary (tavern/inn) on the post road (or King's Highway) between Williamsburg, Virginia and Philadelphia, Pennsylvania. Earlier, it had been the junction of native American Chiskiack trails along the ridge above the York River and trails northeast and northwest. Although many revolutionary-era soldiers from Newtown left the area, the town became known for its private schools, as well as several resident physicians and merchants. Several large plantations surrounded the crossroads, but the county seat was located at King and Queen Courthouse. Newtown became strategically important during the American Civil War, although not a battleground, and in June 1863 Confederate General George Pickett gathered his division in Newtown before departing for the Battle of Gettysburg.

Since its listing on the National Register of Historic Places in 1982, 1982 the district encompasses 22 contributing buildings, 1 contributing site, and 1 contributing structure. The district also includes a frame grocery store (1922) and family cemetery.

References

Historic districts on the National Register of Historic Places in Virginia
Buildings and structures in King and Queen County, Virginia
National Register of Historic Places in King and Queen County, Virginia